Paberkeh (also Romanized as Pāberkeh) is a village in Abshur Rural District, Forg District, Darab County, Fars Province, Iran. At the 2006 census, its population was 13, in 4 families.

References 

Populated places in Darab County